Harm G. Schröter (Schroeter) is German professor of economic history at the University of Bergen, Norway.

After studying history, geography and pedagogic he received his PhD in 1981 from the Department of History at University of Hamburg and in 1992 his Habilitation from the Department of Economics at the Free University of Berlin. Since then he has taught at several universities in Germany, Norway and the United States in both, departments of economics and of history. 
Schröter's main project is to find out more about Europe's specific economic profile and character during the last two centuries. Consequently, he explored on the relation between state and the economy, economic cooperation (cartels, cooperatives, cooperation between capital and labour, etc.), European multinational enterprise, technological innovation, (dis-) advantages of European small developed states, institutions and innovation, the “European enterprise”, and on the transfer of economic behaviour and values (Americanization).
Among others Schröter served as the President of European Business History Association and on several advisory and editorial boards.

Selected bibliography 
 Schröter, Harm G., Americanization of the European Economy. A compact survey of American economic influence in Europe since the 1880s, Springer, Dordrecht, 2005
 Schröter, Harm G., Geschichte Skandinaviens, C. H. Beck, München, 2007
 Schröter, Harm G. (ed.), The European Enterprise, Historical investigation into a future species, Springer, Berlin & Heidelberg, 2008
 Schröter, Harm G. (ed.), Americanization in Europe in the Twentieth Century, special edition of European Review of History, Vol. 15, No. 4, 2009, 
 Battilani, Patrizia and Schröter, Harm G. (ed.), The cooperative business movement, 1950 to the present, Cambridge University Press, Cambridge, 2012
Clifton, Judith and Lanthier, Pierre and Schröter, Harm G. (eds.) The Economic and Social Regulation of Public Utilities: An International History, Routledge, London, 2012
 Barjot, Dominique and Schröter, Harm G., Economic cooperation reconsidered, Special edition of Revue Économique, 2013, vol. 64, No. 6
 Barjot, Dominique and Schröter, Harm G., La circulation de l’information et des connaissances, special edition of Entreprises et Histoire, 2014, vol. 75
 For a more comprehensive overview see: www.harmschroeter.de

References

External links 
 www.harmschroeter.de

Business historians
Academic staff of the University of Bergen
Living people
Year of birth missing (living people)
German historians
German economists
German emigrants to Norway